Nueil-sous-Faye (literally Nueil under Faye) is a commune in the Vienne department in the Nouvelle-Aquitaine region in western France.

Demographics

See also
Communes of the Vienne department

References

External links

Nueil-sous-Faye on the Diwali site
Tourism office

Communes of Vienne